Cheng Jei-cheng  (born 11 June 1946), in Su'ao, Yilan County, was Minister of Education of Taiwan from 2008 to 2009, serving in the cabinet of President Ma Ying-jeou. Prior to his appointment, Cheng served as president of National Chengchi University.

Education
Cheng obtained his bachelor's degree in journalism from National Chengchi University (NCCU) in 1969, master's degree and doctoral degree in journalism from Ohio State University in the United States in 1975 and 1978, respectively.

Early career
Cheng worked as a professor at National Chiao Tung University, dean of the College of Communication of NCCU and president of NCCU.

References

Living people
1946 births
Taiwanese educators
Taiwanese Ministers of Education
Politicians of the Republic of China on Taiwan from Yilan County, Taiwan
National Chengchi University alumni
People from Su'ao